Rafael Gordillo Vázquez (born 24 February 1957) is a Spanish retired footballer. A tremendously attacking left wing-back, equally at ease as defender and midfielder and with a good effort rate, he had an unmistakable style of playing with his socks down.

He represented mainly Betis and Real Madrid during his career, appearing in 428 La Liga games and scoring 38 goals over 16 seasons. He won ten major titles with the latter club, including five national championships.

Gordillo was a mainstay for the Spain national team in the 80s, appearing in 75 matches and representing the nation in five international tournaments.

Club career
Born in Almendralejo, Province of Badajoz, Extremadura, Gordillo moved to Seville (from where his parents were originally) when he was just a few months old. He grew up in the Polígono de San Pablo neighbourhood, and signed with Real Betis in 1972 at the age of 15. On 30 January 1977 he made his first-team and La Liga debut, against Burgos CF, and helped the Andalusians to win the Copa del Rey in his first year.

After nine professional seasons with Betis – 12 in total, and another with the reserve side – being named the country's footballer of the year at the end of 1979–80 and appearing in nearly 300 official matches, Gordillo moved to Real Madrid for 1985–86, winning the UEFA Cup in his debut campaign and scoring in the final against 1. FC Köln, and forming a dreaded left-wing partnership with José Antonio Camacho during his tenure, with the former playing as a midfielder. In 1989's Spanish Cup, he scored the final's only goal against Real Valladolid.

Gordillo returned to Betis in 1992 at the age of 35, helping them return to the top division in his second year and retiring after one final season with neighbours Écija Balompié, also in the Segunda División. With the latter, he later worked as director of football.

In the following decade, Gordillo returned to Betis also in directorial capacities. On 13 December 2010, he was elected the club's president.

International career
Gordillo earned 75 caps and scored three goals for Spain over one decade. His debut came on 29 March 1978, in a friendly 3–0 win over Norway in Gijón.

Gordillo went on to represent the country in two FIFA World Cups (1982 and 1986) and three UEFA European Championships (1980, 1984 and 1988, appearing in all the matches but one in the second competition for an eventual runner-up finish).

International goals

Post-retirement
Gordillo re-joined Betis for a third time, appearing for the club in the indoor soccer national league. He also worked briefly for laSexta as a sports commentator, at the 2006 World Cup.

Honours
Betis
Copa del Rey: 1976–77

Real Madrid
La Liga: 1985–86, 1986–87, 1987–88, 1988–89, 1989–90
Copa del Rey: 1988–89
Supercopa de España: 1988, 1989, 1990
UEFA Cup: 1985–86

Spain
UEFA European Championship runner-up: 1984

Individual
Best Spanish player: 1979–80

See also
List of La Liga players (400+ appearances)
List of Real Betis players (+100 appearances)
List of Real Madrid CF players

References

External links

Betisweb stats and bio 

1957 births
Living people
People from Almendralejo
Spanish footballers
Footballers from Extremadura
Association football defenders
Association football midfielders
La Liga players
Segunda División players
Betis Deportivo Balompié footballers
Real Betis players
Real Madrid CF players
Écija Balompié players
Spain under-21 international footballers
Spain under-23 international footballers
Spain amateur international footballers
Spain international footballers
UEFA Euro 1980 players
1982 FIFA World Cup players
UEFA Euro 1984 players
1986 FIFA World Cup players
UEFA Euro 1988 players
UEFA Cup winning players
Spanish beach soccer players
Real Betis non-playing staff